The Lottery Bride is a 1930 American Pre-Code musical film directed by Paul L. Stein and starring Jeanette MacDonald, John Garrick, ZaSu Pitts, and Joe E. Brown. The film was produced by Joseph M. Schenck and Arthur Hammerstein, based on the musical by Rudolf Friml, and released by United Artists. William Cameron Menzies is credited with the production design and special effects.

The film's final reel was in Technicolor in the original 80-minute release in 1930. However, most existing prints are black-and-white prints of the shorter (67-minute) 1937 re-release.

Cast
 Jeanette MacDonald as Jenny 
 John Garrick as 	Chris
 Joe E. Brown as 	Hoke
 Zasu Pitts as 	Hilda
 Robert Chisholm as Olaf
 Joseph Macauley as Alberto 
 Harry Gribbon as 	Boris
 Carroll Nye as 	Nels

Preservation status
On December 14, 2011, Turner Classic Movies presented a print of this film from George Eastman House, which restored the tinted sequences and the final reel in Technicolor.

See also
List of early color feature films

References

External links

1930 films
1930s romantic musical films
1930s color films
American romantic musical films
Films scored by Rudolf Friml
Films directed by Paul L. Stein
Films set in Norway
Operetta films
United Artists films
American black-and-white films
1930s American films